Mjölnir is the hammer of Thor in Norse mythology.

Mjolnir may also refer to:

 85585 Mjolnir, an Apollo asteroid
 Mjølnir impact crater, off the coast of Norway
 Bombkapsel 90 stand off submunition dispenser
 "Halo Theme MJOLNIR Mix", a piece in the soundtrack of Halo 2
 Granatkastarpansarbandvagn (Grkpbv) 90, a Swedish variant of the Combat Vehicle 90
 MJOLNIR battle armor, the combat suit from the Halo video games
 Mjolnir (comics), Thor's hammer as depicted in Marvel Comics
Marie Mjolnir, a character in the manga/anime Soul Eater
 , a Norwegian Monitor type warship
 Mjölnir, pseudonym of Nazi propagandist Hans Schweitzer
 Mjolnir LLC, a gaming company

See also
 Thor's Hammer (disambiguation)